The Nördlingen-Gunzenhausen railway is located in northern Swabia and western Middle Franconia. The 40 km route is now a heritage railway, operated with a passenger train that is known as the Lakeland Express after the Franconian Lake District (Fränkischen Seenland). The line opened in 1849 and is one of the oldest lines in Germany. A partial reactivation of regular passenger traffic is planned.

History 

The line was opened in 1849 by the Royal Bavarian State Railways as part of the Ludwig South-North Railway. Until 1906, when the Donauwörth–Treuchtlingen line opened, it was part of the shortest rail connection between Augsburg and Nuremberg.

On 29 September 1985, Deutsche Bundesbahn closed passenger services on the line. Deutsche Bahn (DB) closed freight services on the line on 1 August 1995 (Wassertrüdingen–Gunzenhausen) and 1 June 1997 (Nördlingen–Wassertrüdingen).

In 1999, the Bavarian Railways Operating Company (BayernBahn Betriebsgesellschaft), a subsidiary of the Bavarian Railway Museum (Bayerische Eisenbahnmuseum, BEM), contracted a long-term lease of the line from DB. On 8 June 2003 the BEM was able to start museum operations on the entire line.

Operations
On some days the Bavarian Railway Museum operates passenger services hauled by steam locomotives.
 
Since October 2004, freight services have operated on the line connecting the factory of the cosmetics company, Schwarzkopf, in Wassertrüdingen with Nördlingen. Twice a week Bavarian Railways operates tank wagons carrying industrial alcohol. Since 7 January 2010 Bavarian Railways runs trains every day with finished products to Langenfeld, Rhineland; the rest of the line to the central warehouse of the Henkel Group in Monheim am Rhein is operated by Monheim City Railways (Bahnen der Stadt Monheim). All these freight services run over the section of the line between Wassertrüdingen and Gunzenhausen.

References

Railway lines in Bavaria
Railway lines opened in 1849
1849 establishments in Bavaria
Buildings and structures in Ansbach (district)
Buildings and structures in Weißenburg-Gunzenhausen
Buildings and structures in Donau-Ries